The Bezirk Gera was a district (Bezirk) of East Germany. The administrative seat and main town was Gera.

History
The district was established, with the other 13, on 25 July 1952, replacing the old German states. After 3 October 1990 it was disestablished following German reunification, becoming again part of the state of Thuringia.

Geography

Position
The Bezirk Gera had borders with the Bezirke of Suhl, Erfurt, Halle, Leipzig and Karl-Marx-Stadt, as well as with West Germany.

Subdivision
The Bezirk was divided into 13 Kreise: 2 urban districts (Stadtkreise) and 11 rural districts (Landkreise): 
Urban districts : Gera; Jena.
Rural districts : Eisenberg; Gera-Land; Greiz; Jena-Land; Lobenstein; Pößneck; Rudolstadt; Saalfeld; Schleiz; Stadtroda; Zeulenroda.

References

Gera
Bezirk Gera
Gera
Former states and territories of Thuringia
Jena